A harpoon is a long spear-like instrument used in fishing to catch fish or other aquatic animals such as whales.

Harpoon may also refer to:

Games
 Harpoon (series), a series of air and naval combat simulator video games
Harpoon (video game), the first game in that series

Military
 Harpoon (missile), an American anti-ship missile
 PV-2 Harpoon, an American anti-submarine aircraft
 Harpoon-3, a Russian anti-drone rifle

Music
Harpoon, a band that featured on the 1974 soundtrack of Little Malcolm
Ezra Furman and the Harpoons, rock band
Kid Harpoon (born 1982), English singer
Harpoon (album), a 2005 album by Larkin Grimm
 Harpoon (EP), a 1998 EP by Jebediah, or the title song
"Harpoon" (song), a spong by Knife Party and Pegboard Nerds
"Harpoon", a song by Brecker Brothers from the 1994 album Out of the Loop
"Harpoon", a song by Scott Henderson from the 1997 album Tore Down House

Other uses
 Harpoon 6.2, a Canadian sailboat design
 Harpoon (comics), a Marvel comic book character, member of the Marauders
 Harpoon (1948 film), a 1948 American film 
 Harpoon (2019 film), a 2019 comedy thriller film
 Reykjavik Whale Watching Massacre, also known as Harpoon, a 2009 Icelandic horror film
 The Harpoon, a satirical radio programme on BBC Radio 4 between 1991 and 1994
 Harpoon (hieroglyph), a single-point harpoon hieroglyph used as an Egyptian hieroglyph to mean  'single item' 
 Harpoon reaction (or harpoon mechanism), a type of chemical reaction

See also
 Harpoon Brewery, an American brewery
 Harpooned
 Harpooner (ship)